Kızkalesi means "Maiden's castle" in Turkish and iy may refer to;
Kızkalesi (ancient Corycus) a town in Erdemli district of Mersin Province
Kızkalesi a castle built on a small islet and facing the town Kızkalesi

See also
Kızlar Kalesi 
Kızlar Monastery
Kız Kulesi